Continuity Studios (formerly Continuity Associates, originally known as Continuity Graphics Associates) is a New York City and Los Angeles-based art and illustration studio formed by cartoonists Neal Adams and Dick Giordano. Still in business after almost fifty years, the company showed that the graphic vernacular of the comic book could be employed in profitable endeavors outside the confines of traditional comics.

History 
At its founding in 1971, Continuity primarily supplied motion picture storyboards and advertising art. As times changed, Continuity adapted its services to offer animatics, 3D computer graphics, and conceptual design. 

Over the years, Continuity has also served as an art packager for comic book publishers, including such companies as Charlton Comics, Marvel Comics, Adams' own Continuity Comics, and the one-shot Big Apple Comix. The company served as the launching pad for the careers of a number of professional cartoonists. When doing collective comics work, the artists were often credited as "Crusty Bunkers."

More established cartoonists like Win Mortimer found work at Continuity profitable enough that they left the comics industry to work exclusively on Continuity projects.

A snapshot of the studio in 1977–1978 came in the form of the wraparound cover for the oversize celebrity comic book Superman vs. Muhammad Ali — illustrated by Continuity co-founders Neal Adams and Dick Giordano — which portrayed Jack Abel, Mark Alexander, Joe Barney, Pat Bastine, Cary Bates, Joe Brozowski, Joe D'Esposito, John Fuller, Michael Netzer (Nasser), Carl Potts, Marshall Rogers, Trevor Von Eeden, and Bob Wiacek as members of "Neal Adams' Continuity Associates."

Continuity Associates members 
People who at one time or another were members of Continuity Associates:

 Jack Abel
 Mark Alexander
 Terry Austin
 Joe Barney
 Pat Bastine
 Cary Bates
 Liz Berube
 Pat Broderick
 Joe Brozowski
 Howard Chaykin

 Joe D'Esposito
 John Fuller
 Steve Mitchell 
 Al Gordon
 Larry Hama
 Bob Layton
 Val Mayerik
 Bob McLeod
 Al Milgrom
 Win Mortimer
 Michael Netzer (Nasser)

 Carl Potts
 Marshall Rogers
 Joe Rubinstein
 Walt Simonson
 Jim Starlin
 Greg Theakston
 Trevor Von Eeden
 Bob Wiacek

See also 
 Crusty Bunkers
 Continuity Comics

References

External links 
 

Companies based in New York City
Design companies established in 1971
Graphic design studios
Continuity Comics
1971 establishments in New York City

https://www.nerdteam30.com/creator-conversations-retro/an-interview-with-steve-mitchell-invasion-of-the-blue-jean-generation